Gaylad may refer to:
The Gaylads, band
Gaylad (horse)